Annie Moore may refer to:

 Annie Moore (immigrant) (1877–1923), Irish immigrant to America, first immigrant to pass through Ellis Island
 Annie Carroll Moore (1871–1961), American author and illustrator
 Annie Carter Moore, English author Beatrix Potter's childhood governess

See also
 Ann Moore (disambiguation)